Stewart Ridge is a commuter rail station along the Blue Island Branch of the Metra Electric line in the West Pullman neighborhood of Chicago, Illinois. The official address, according to Metra is Stewart Ridge, South of 120th Place.

Like many Metra Electric stations, Stewart Ridge is little more than a pre-fabricated shelter on an elevated platform. No parking or bus service is available at this station.

References

External links 

 Harvard Avenue entrance from Google Maps Street View
 Stewart Avenue entrance from Google Maps Street View

Metra stations in Chicago